This is a list of the Roman governors of Thracia.

References 

 
Thracia